Luis Arroyo Jr. is a Democratic member of the Cook County Board of Commissioners, representing the 8th district.  In 2014 Arroyo defeated incumbent Edwin Reyes to become a Cook County commissioner.

In 2015, Arroyo was a key vote to raise the Cook County sales tax. Arroyo is the son of former Illinois State Representative Luis Arroyo.

In 2021, Arroyo's taxes were subpoenaed by Federal prosecutors as part of a broader corruption probe investigating connections between lobbyists and Illinois politicians.

In 2022, Arroyo lost his Democratic primary for reelection to challenger Anthony Quezada.

References 

Hispanic and Latino American politicians
Illinois Democrats
Living people
Members of the Cook County Board of Commissioners
Place of birth missing (living people)
Year of birth missing (living people)